Jörg Spengler (23 December 1938 – 26 November 2013) was a German sailor. He won a bronze medal in the Tornado class with Jörg Schmall at the 1976 Summer Olympics in Montreal.

References 

1938 births
2013 deaths
People from Remscheid
Sportspeople from Düsseldorf (region)
German male sailors (sport)
Olympic sailors of West Germany
Olympic bronze medalists for West Germany
Olympic medalists in sailing
Medalists at the 1976 Summer Olympics
Sailors at the 1976 Summer Olympics – Tornado
Tornado class world champions
World champions in sailing for Germany